Random Roads Collection is a compilation album released in 2012 by Project Trio. The album was released under Tummy Touch Records.

Track listing
Interlude:Slidy
Dr. Nick
Fables Of Faubus
Cherry Blossoms
Semuta
Visual Machine
Dup Dup
Interlude: 2nd Happiest Song In The World
Winter In June
My House
Grass
Random Roads Suite II-Adagio
Sweet Pea
Three Movie Scenes
Teenie
Arco:Pizz

References
 http://tummytouch.com/
 http://www.projecttrio.com/
 http://www.allmusic.com/album/the-random-roads-collection-r2422858
 http://www.allgigs.co.uk/view/review/6264/Project_Trio_Random_Roads_Collection_Album_Review.html

2012 compilation albums